An application service provider (ASP) is a business providing application software generally through the Web.

The ASP model
The application software resides on the vendor's system and is accessed by users through a communication protocol. Alternatively, the vendor may provide special purpose client software. Client software may interface with these systems through an application programming interface.

ASP characteristics include:
 ASP fully owns and operates the software application(s)
 ASP owns, operates and maintains the servers that support the software
 ASP makes information available to customers via the Internet or a thin client
 ASP may bill on a per-use basis, a monthly/annual fee, or a per-labor hour basis

The advantages to this approach include:
 Software costs for the application are spread over multiple clients
 Vendors provide more application experience than the in-house staff
 Key software systems are kept up to date and managed for performance by experts
 Access to product and technology experts dedicated to available products
 Reduction of internal IT costs to a predictable fee

Some disadvantages include:
 The client must generally accept the application as provided 
 The client must rely on the provider for a critical business function
 The client must adapt to possible vendor changes
 Integration with other applications may be problematic

See also
 Application server
 Business service provider
 Communication as a service
 Hosted service provider
 Multitenancy
 Outsourcing
 Service level agreement
 Software as a service
 Utility computing
 Web application

References

External links 
 

IT service management
Customer relationship management